Yegor Kuzmich Ligachyov (also transliterated as Ligachev; ; 29 November 1920 – 7 May 2021) was a Soviet and Russian politician who was a high-ranking official in the Communist Party of the Soviet Union (CPSU), and who continued an active political career in post-Soviet Russia. Originally an ally of Mikhail Gorbachev, Ligachyov became a challenger to his leadership.

Early life
Ligachyov was born on 29 November 1920 in a village called Dubinkino in the Kainsky district of the Tomsk province (now the Chulymsky District in the Novosibirsk Oblast). Between 1938 and 1943 he attended the Ordzhonikidze Institute for Aviation in Moscow and attained a technical engineering degree. Ligachyov joined the Communist Party at the age of 24 in 1944, later studying at the Higher Party School in 1951.

Personal life
He had one son.

Political career
Ligachyov's career began in his native Siberia and took him to some of the highest functions of the Party. He was often regarded as Gorbachev's second man, holding important posts such as the Secretary for Ideology. However, Ligachyov lost his posts in 1990, a year before the dissolution of the Soviet Union, resigning from his political career at the 28th Party Congress. Ligachyov was critical of Boris Yeltsin and Gorbachev to an extent, although he is often portrayed as having been Gorbachev's primary critic.

In the USSR

Ligachyov was First Secretary of the Novosibirsk Komsomol, before becoming Deputy Chairman of the Novosibirsk Soviet, and then Secretary of the Novosibirsk Obkom between 1959 and 1961.

Ligachyov gained his first major post in 1961, when he began working in the Central Committee of the CPSU. In 1965, he became First Secretary of the Party in Tomsk, Siberia. During his time there he led the cover-up of the Stalin-era mass grave at Kolpashevo. He was to hold this position until 1983, when he was discovered by Yuri Andropov and made head of the Party Organization Department and a Secretary of the Central Committee.

In 1966, Ligachyov was elected a candidate member of the Central Committee, and ten years later in 1976 he was promoted to a full member. When Mikhail Gorbachev became General Secretary in 1985, Ligachyov was promoted to become a Secretary of higher status, and was generally viewed as one of Gorbachev's primary allies: he had helped organize a pro-Gorbachev faction in hope of having Gorbachev succeed Andropov in 1984, although this attempt failed (instead, Konstantin Chernenko was chosen as a stop-gap candidate). Ligachyov was made head of the Secretariat.

Ligachyov supported reform of the Soviet Union and initially supported Gorbachev; however, as Gorbachev's policies of perestroika and glasnost began to resemble what were seen as social democratic policies, he distanced himself from Gorbachev, and by 1988 he was recognized as the leader of the more conservative, anti-Gorbachev faction of Soviet politicians. During this period, Ligachyov began to utter the phrase "Boris, you are wrong" when referring to Yeltsin in a political discourse. Ligachyov served in the Politburo between 1985 and 1990. Ligachyov, having made some speeches criticizing Gorbachev, was demoted from his more prestigious position as Secretary for Ideology to Secretary for Agriculture on 30 September 1988.

At the 28th Congress of the CPSU in 1990, he criticized Gorbachev for circumventing the Party via the Soviet Presidency, and he argued Glasnost had gone too far. During the Party Congress, Ligachyov challenged Gorbachev for the office of General Secretary, standing as the "Leninist" candidate. Having been defeated, Ligachyov left the Politburo for temporary retirement.

Russian Federation
After the Soviet Union collapsed in 1991, Ligachyov became a communist politician in the Russian Federation. Ligachyov was elected three times to the Russian State Duma as a member for the Communist Party of the Russian Federation. Ligachyov was a member of its Central Committee from 1993 on. However, he lost his seat in the Duma in 2003, when he polled 23.5 percent of the vote against United Russia candidate Vladimir Zhidkikh's 53 percent.

Ligachyov's memoirs, Inside Gorbachev's Kremlin, were published in 1996. Serge Schmemann of The New York Times wrote that the author was driven "to seek explanations for what went wrong, to understand his own role" and while the reviewer wished for more intrigue (in the form of detailed accounts of events other than the dissolution of the USSR), he believed the book was an interesting and detailed account of that period from the perspective of an "honest Bolshevik".

Significance
Ligachyov became one of Gorbachev's primary critics, and was accused of leading a conservative faction. Although publicly endorsing perestroika, Ligachyov was opposed to Gorbachev's attempts to expand Soviet authority and limit the responsibilities of party officials. Ligachyov did not support the decision to end the CPSU's monopoly of political power in 1990, nor did he support Gorbachev's response to the gradual withdrawal of Soviet authority in Eastern Europe. He saw the quick reunification of Germany as being an "impending danger".

However, in 1988, Ligachyov denied that he was leading a conservative faction, saying that the Party leadership were united behind Gorbachev. He also rejected suggestions after the fall of the Soviet Union that he had been opposed to Gorbachev in his memoirs and in speeches. Ligachyov clearly demonstrated conservative ideas in his opposition of Yeltsin's political ideas, on the other hand, opposing the principles of glasnost. He later repudiated his opposition to Gorbachev's policies, saying it was "only too late [he] discerned a social democrat in Gorbachev". However, Ligachyov repeatedly denied he was opposed to Gorbachev in sources including his memoirs.

Ligachyov's economically hard-line views were upheld in speeches he made to the CPSU's Congress in 1990. The following deplored privatization of the economy:

However, in this speech he also rejected the idea he was a conservative, saying he was a realist. Ligachyov also stated earlier that "the slackening of state discipline" was "among the reasons for the troubled state of the economy". Furthermore, together with KGB chief Viktor Chebrikov, Ligachyov took several opportunities before he was demoted to Secretary for Agriculture in 1988 to warn against rapid reform.

Although not mentioned in his memoirs to any notable extent, Ligachyov played a significant role in dismissing Yeltsin, arguing with him for long periods of time in 1987. Ligachyov opposed Yeltsin's idea that Party officials enjoyed greater privilege.

Ligachyov was considered "Second Secretary" of the Central Committee (and thus the Soviet Union) for most of his time in the Politburo.

Death
Yegor Ligachyov died at the age of 100 on 7 May 2021.

References

Bibliography
Inside Gorbachev's Kremlin: The Memoirs of Yegor Ligachev. Pantheon Books: 1993
Ligachev on Glasnost and Perestroika. Carl Beck Papers in Russian and East European Studies, no. 706: 1989.

1920 births
2021 deaths
People from Novosibirsk Oblast
People of the Cold War
Communist Party of the Russian Federation members
Members of the Congress of People's Deputies of the Soviet Union
Moscow Aviation Institute alumni
Politburo of the Central Committee of the Communist Party of the Soviet Union members
Seventh convocation members of the Soviet of the Union
Eighth convocation members of the Soviet of the Union
Ninth convocation members of the Soviet of the Union
Tenth convocation members of the Soviet of the Union
Eleventh convocation members of the Soviet of the Union
Third convocation members of the State Duma (Russian Federation)
Recipients of the Order of Lenin
Recipients of the Order of the Red Banner of Labour
Men centenarians
Russian centenarians
Deaths from pneumonia in Russia
Burials in Troyekurovskoye Cemetery